Homostegia is a genus of fungi in the class Dothideomycetes. The relationship of this taxon to other taxa within the class is unknown (incertae sedis).

Species
 Homostegia adusta
 Homostegia andina
 Homostegia asparagi
 Homostegia coscinodisca
 Homostegia dermatocarpi
 Homostegia derridis
 Homostegia durionis
 Homostegia durissima
 Homostegia glomerata
 Homostegia hertelii
 Homostegia ischaemi
 Homostegia kelseyi
 Homostegia leucosticta
 Homostegia lophiostomacea
 Homostegia magnoliae
 Homostegia minutissima
 Homostegia obscura
 Homostegia piggotii
 Homostegia polypodii
 Homostegia procedens
 Homostegia pterocarpi
 Homostegia stictarum
 Homostegia striola
 Homostegia symploci

See also
 List of Dothideomycetes genera incertae sedis

References

Dothideomycetes enigmatic taxa
Dothideomycetes genera